Seh Kani (also Romanized as Seh Kānī; also known as Sakaneh, Sakānī, Sehgāneh) is a village in Dasht-e Bil Rural District, in the Central District of Oshnavieh County, West Azerbaijan Province, Iran. At the 2006 census, its population was 663, in 143 families.

References 

Populated places in Oshnavieh County